This is a list of scientific journals in chemistry and its various subfields. For journals mainly about materials science, see List of materials science journals.

A

B
 Beilstein Journal of Organic Chemistry
 Biochemical Journal
 Bioconjugate Chemistry
 Biomacromolecules
 Biomedical Chromatography
 Bioorganic & Medicinal Chemistry
 Bioorganic & Medicinal Chemistry Letters
 Bulletin of the Chemical Society of Japan

C

D
 Dalton Transactions

E
 Education in Chemistry
 Energy and Environmental Science
 Energy & Fuels
 Environmental Chemistry
 European Journal of Inorganic Chemistry
 European Journal of Medicinal Chemistry
 European Journal of Organic Chemistry

F
 Faraday Discussions
 Faraday Transactions

G
 Geostandards and Geoanalytical Research
 Green Chemistry

H
 Helvetica Chimica Acta

I
 Inorganic Chemistry
 International Journal of Hydrogen Energy
 International Journal of Quantum Chemistry
 Ion Exchange Letters

J

L
 Lab on a Chip
 Langmuir
 Liebigs Annalen

M
 Macedonian Journal of Chemistry and Chemical Engineering
 Macromolecules
 Magnetic Resonance in Chemistry
 Metallomics
 Methods in Organic Synthesis
 Microchimica Acta
 Molbank
 Molecular BioSystems
 Molecular Diversity
 Molecular Physics
 Molecules

N
 Nano Letters
 Natural Product Reports
 Nature Chemical Biology
 Nature Chemistry
 Nature Materials
 Nature Protocols
 New Journal of Chemistry

O
 Open Chemistry
 Organic and Biomolecular Chemistry
 Organic Letters
 Organometallics

P
 PeerJ Analytical Chemistry
PeerJ Inorganic Chemistry
PeerJ Materials Science
PeerJ Organic Chemistry
PeerJ Physical Chemistry
Perkin Transactions
 Photochemical and Photobiological Sciences
 Physical Chemistry Chemical Physics
 Polish Journal of Chemistry
 Polyhedron
 Proceedings of the Chemical Society

R
 RSC Advances
 Revista Boliviana de Quimica
 Revista de la Sociedad Venezolana Química

S

 Scientia Pharmaceutica
 Soft Matter
 Spectroscopy Letters
 Surface Science Reports
 Synlett
 Synthesis
 Science China Chemistry

T
 Talanta
 Tetrahedron
 Tetrahedron Letters
Theoretical Chemistry Accounts
 Trends in Analytical Chemistry

Z
 Zeitschrift für Naturforschung
 Zeitschrift für Naturforschung B
 Zeitschrift für Physikalische Chemie

See also 
 Chemistry
 List of scientific journals
 Open access journal
 Scientific journal
 Scientific literature

External links 

 Chemical Abstracts Service Source Index (CASSI) Search Tool search journal titles, abbreviations, CODENs, and ISSNs
 Beyond CASSI compilation of historical journal abbreviations from A., B., C. to Z.; includes CASSI abbreviations used for these journals
 Science and Engineering Journal Abbreviations
 List of chemistry journal publishers

 
Chemistry
Journals